Julio Álvarez del Vayo (1890 in Villaviciosa de Odón, Community of Madrid – 3 May 1975 in Geneva, Switzerland) was a Spanish Socialist politician, journalist and writer.

Biography
Álvarez studied Law at the Universities of Madrid and Valladolid and he did postdoctoral work at the London School of Economics. He joined the Spanish Socialist Workers' Party (PSOE) at a very young age and he opposed to the collaboration of that party with the dictatorship of Primo de Rivera (1923–1930). He wrote for the newspapers La Nación of Argentina, El Liberal and El Sol of Spain, and The Guardian of Britain. He visited the United States, the European fronts during the First World War and the Soviet Union as a journalist. In 1930 he conspired for an armed uprising against the Monarchy. When the Second Republic was proclaimed he was appointed ambassador to Mexico and to the Soviet Union, and later he was elected a member of the Parliament. He followed the PSOE's revolutionary wing led by Largo Caballero.

During the Civil War he held several political offices on the Republican side: he was twice minister of Foreign Affairs, delegate to the League of Nations and commissar and general of the Army. He was a member of the peace commission which monitored the dispute between Bolivia and Paraguay in 1933, at the peak of the Chaco War. After the Francoist conquest of Catalonia and while the majority of the Republican leaders decided to remain in France, he returned to the Republican zone and led the last attacks against the Francoist troops. He fled by airplane from the base in Monòver, Alicante shortly before the armistice.

During the 1940s and 1950s Álvarez del Vayo lived in exile in Mexico, the United States and Switzerland. He radicalized his political positions and was expelled from the PSOE. He then founded the Unión Socialista Española, which was very close to the Communist Party of Spain. In 1963, following the abandoning of armed struggle by the Communist Party and the waning of the activity of the Spanish Maquis, Álvarez del Vayo felt the need for a pro-Republican movement carrying out the armed struggle within Spain and established the Spanish National Liberation Front (FELN). However, the FELN as a group remained small and its activity was very limited owing to the effectiveness and fierceness of the Spanish police network. Finally in 1971 Álvarez del Vayo's FELN was integrated into the Revolutionary Antifascist Patriotic Front (FRAP). Álvarez del Vayo was the acting president of FRAP at the time of his death, which occurred on 3 May 1975 after suffering a cardiac failure on 26 April.

Writings
La nueva Rusia. En camión por la estepa. Las dos revoluciones, siluetas..., Madrid: Espasa-Calpe, 1926
La senda roja, Madrid: Espasa-Calpe, 1928
La guerra comenzó en España: lucha por la libertad, Mexico City: Séneca, 1940
Freedom's Battle, New York: Knopf, 1940
The Last Optimist, New York: Viking, 1950
Reportaje en China. Presente y futuro de un gran pueblo, Mexico City: Grijalbo, 1958
China vence, Paris: Ruedo Ibérico, 1964
The March of Socialism, New York: Hill and Wang, 1974
Give me combat, Boston: Little Brown, 1973 (memoir)

References

External links
El hombre que fue presidente del FRAP
El olvidado Álvarez del Vayo
Álvarez del Vayo, el ultimo optimista

1890 births
1975 deaths
People from Villaviciosa de Odón
Spanish Socialist Workers' Party politicians
Foreign ministers of Spain
Ambassadors of Spain to the Soviet Union
Ambassadors of Spain to Mexico
Members of the Congress of Deputies of the Second Spanish Republic
Government ministers during the Second Spanish Republic
20th-century Spanish journalists